Lac-Oscar is an unorganized territory in the Laurentides region of Quebec, Canada, and one of eleven unorganized areas in the Antoine-Labelle Regional County Municipality. No permanent population resides in this territory.

See also
 List of unorganized territories in Quebec

References

Unorganized territories in Laurentides